Aspidimorpha sanctaecrucis, sometimes called the golden tortoise beetle (a common name which refers to other species elsewhere), is an Old World species of beetle belonging to the family Chrysomelidae.

Description
Aspidimorpha sanctaecrucis can reach a length of about 14 mm. This beetle shows a golden reflection in the elytra and prothorax, and a characteristic pattern with well developed posterolateral and humeral spots on the explanate elytral margin. It is active in the rainy season, with diapause in winter and summer. Both adults and larvae feed on Convolvulaceae, mainly on Ipomoea species.

Distribution
This species can be found in southeastern Asia, from China and India to Indonesia.

References
 Michael SCHMITT & Sigrun BOPP   Leaf Beetles (Insecta: Coleoptera: Chrysomelidae) Suffer From Feeding on Fern Leaves
 JOLANTA OEWIÊTOJAÑSKA1 & LECH BOROWIEC  Aspidimorpha (s. str.) tibetana, a new species from China (Coleoptera: Chrysomelidae: Cassidinae)
 T Kalaichelvan  Checklist of Leaf Beetles of Bhilai-Durgh

External links

 Biolib
 Encyclopaedia of Life
 Global Species

Cassidinae
Fauna of Southeast Asia
Beetles described in 1792